Biedermann is German for an honourable, upright man. It may also refer to:

People

Christoph Biedermann (born 1987), Liechtenstein footballer
Edwin Biedermann (1877-1929), British real tennis player
Friedrich Karl Biedermann (1812–1901), German political philosopher
Harry Biedermann (1887–1917), first-class cricketer
Jeanette Biedermann (born 1980), German singer, actress and television personality
Johann Jakob Biedermann (1763–1830), Swiss painter and etcher
Julia Biedermann (born 1967), German television actress 
Kyle Biedermann, American politician
Marc Biedermann, American musician for heavy metal band Blind Illusion
Paul Biedermann (born 1986), German swimmer

Arts
 Der Biedermann, a moralistic weekly (1727–1729) by Johann Christoph Gottsched
 Biedermann und die Brandstifter, a 1953 play by Max Frisch, published in English as The Fire Raisers or The Arsonists
 Biedermann Museum, a museum in Donaueschingen, Germany
 Biedermann (band), a rock band from Fürstenfeld in Styria, Austria

See also
 Ann Biderman (b 1951)

German-language surnames